Pole is a village in the North-East District of Botswana. In 2001, the population was 318. In 2011, the population was 288.

References

Villages in Botswana
North-East District (Botswana)